Geoffrey Edwards is the name of:
 Geoff Edwards (1931–2014), American actor and game show host
 Geoffrey Edwards (Canadian scientist), Canadian geomatics scientist
 Geoffrey Edwards (political scientist) (born 1945), British academic

See also
Jeff Edwards (born 1959), American author